The Great Outdoors is a British television sitcom.

The show follows the friendships of a misfit rambling club in Southern England in which patronising group-leader Bob (Mark Heap) becomes embroiled in a battle of wills against new arrival and deputy group-leader Christine (Ruth Jones), who is determined that things should be done her way. She previously lived and rambled in Barnstaple and appears to have obsessive-compulsive personality disorder.

The show comprised three episodes, first airing on Wednesdays between 28 July and 12 August 2010 on BBC Four.

Characters
Ruth Jones as Christine
Mark Heap as Bob Stevens
Steve Edge as Tom
Katherine Parkinson as Sophie
Stephen Wight as Joe
Gwyneth Keyworth as Hazel Stevens
Joe Tracini as Victor

External links

2010 British television series debuts
2010 British television series endings
2010s British sitcoms
BBC high definition shows
BBC television sitcoms
English-language television shows